Martín Troncoso (born January 31, 1986 in Maciá (Entre Ríos), Argentina) is an Argentine footballer currently playing for Iberia of the Primera Division B in Chile.

Teams
  Colón de Santa Fe 2007
  Defensa y Justicia 2008
  9 de Julio de Rafaela 2008-2009
  Espoli 2010
  Villa San Carlos 2011-2014
  Iberia 2014–present

External links
 
 

1986 births
Living people
Argentine footballers
Argentine expatriate footballers
Club Atlético Villa San Carlos footballers
Club Atlético Colón footballers
Defensa y Justicia footballers
Deportes Iberia footballers
C.D. ESPOLI footballers
Primera B de Chile players
Expatriate footballers in Chile
Expatriate footballers in Ecuador
9 de Julio de Rafaela players
Association footballers not categorized by position
Sportspeople from Entre Ríos Province